Cyamops kaplanae is a species of fly.

References

kaplanae
Insects described in 2000